Earl George Spalding (born 11 March 1965 in South Perth) is a former Australian rules footballer who played for Melbourne and Carlton in the Victorian Football League/Australian Football League (VFL/AFL), as well as for Perth and East Fremantle in the West Australian Football League. He is known as "the Duke" or "Snake" because of his unusual running style, and also the "golf ball" in reference to his surname.

Spalding grew up in Perth, Western Australia, where he attended Wesley College. His father, George Spalding, was a well-known West Australian National Football League (WANFL) player with the Perth Football Club.

After leaving school, Spalding played for 63 games for Perth between 1983 and 1986, reaching the preliminary final in 1986. He also played four games of first-class cricket for Western Australia as a fast bowler, during the 1984/85 season, taking 12 wickets at an average of 25.66.

He started his VFL/AFL career with Melbourne and was there from 1987 to 1991, playing 109 games. The following season he signed with Carlton and played all 22 games for the year. He played in a premiership with Carlton in 1995, a year in which he played all 25 games and brought up his 250th game of elite Australian rules football, and in 1996 played his 200th game in the VFL/AFL. 

He played his last senior AFL game in 1997 before returning to Western Australia to play for East Fremantle alongside his brother Scott, who also played one game for Carlton in 1993. Earl played 32 games over the next two seasons, including their 1998 WAFL Premiership winning team, and retired at the end of the 1999 season, having played 306 games across the WAFL and VFL/AFL.

Spalding was the reserves and assistant coach at East Fremantle in 2000 before becoming the league coach in 2001. He resigned from the position at the end of the 2002 season, and since then has working with the Fremantle Football Club as an assistant coach.

Spalding was appointed senior coach of the Perth Demons Football Club in 2015. With an extremely young list and a deliberate policy not to recruit extensively so that the young players could develop, Perth won only two games in 2015. In 2016, the team has won six of its first 14 games, including a victory over top team Subiaco.

Statistics

|- style="background-color: #EAEAEA"
! scope="row" style="text-align:center" | 1987
|
| 35 || 24 || 6 || 5 || 188 || 97 || 285 || 75 || 21 || 35 || 0.3 || 0.2 || 7.8 || 4.0 || 11.9 || 3.1 || 0.9 || 1.5 || 5
|- 
! scope="row" style="text-align:center" | 1988
|
| 5 || 22 || 9 || 22 || 161 || 72 || 233 || 71 || 24 || 8 || 0.4 || 1.0 || 7.3 || 3.3 || 10.6 || 3.2 || 1.1 || 0.4 || 1
|- style="background-color: #EAEAEA"
! scope="row" style="text-align:center" | 1989
|
| 5 || 19 || 19 || 22 || 190 || 97 || 287 || 103 || 16 || 23 || 1.0 || 1.2 || 10.0 || 5.1 || 15.1 || 5.4 || 0.8 || 1.2 || 8
|- 
! scope="row" style="text-align:center" | 1990
|
| 5 || 22 || 15 || 9 || 186 || 108 || 294 || 85 || 24 || 22 || 0.7 || 0.4 || 8.5 || 4.9 || 13.4 || 3.9 || 1.1 || 1.0 || 3
|- style="background-color: #EAEAEA"
! scope="row" style="text-align:center" | 1991
|
| 5 || 22 || 14 || 10 || 199 || 136 || 335 || 111 || 20 || 20 || 0.6 || 0.5 || 9.0 || 6.2 || 15.2 || 5.0 || 0.9 || 0.9 || 0
|- 
! scope="row" style="text-align:center" | 1992
|
| 11 || 22 || 19 || 23 || 206 || 120 || 326 || 95 || 21 || 21 || 0.9 || 1.0 || 9.4 || 5.5 || 14.8 || 4.3 || 1.0 || 1.0 || 6
|- style="background-color: #EAEAEA"
! scope="row" style="text-align:center" | 1993
|
| 11 || 21 || 23 || 22 || 170 || 110 || 280 || 88 || 16 || 12 || 1.1 || 1.0 || 8.1 || 5.2 || 13.3 || 4.2 || 0.8 || 0.6 || 2
|- 
! scope="row" style="text-align:center" | 1994
|
| 11 || 18 || 12 || 17 || 123 || 121 || 244 || 79 || 25 || 14 || 0.7 || 0.9 || 6.8 || 6.7 || 13.6 || 4.4 || 1.4 || 0.8 || 0
|- style="background-color: #EAEAEA"
|style="text-align:center;background:#afe6ba;"|1995†
|
| 11 || 25 || 34 || 22 || 213 || 164 || 377 || 127 || 35 || 50 || 1.4 || 0.9 || 8.5 || 6.6 || 15.1 || 5.1 || 1.4 || 2.0 || 8
|- 
! scope="row" style="text-align:center" | 1996
|
| 11 || 12 || 18 || 10 || 85 || 50 || 135 || 37 || 26 || 10 || 1.5 || 0.8 || 7.1 || 4.2 || 11.3 || 3.1 || 2.2 || 0.8 || 0
|- style="background-color: #EAEAEA"
! scope="row" style="text-align:center" | 1997
|
| 11 || 4 || 0 || 1 || 26 || 13 || 39 || 14 || 5 || 3 || 0.0 || 0.3 || 6.5 || 3.3 || 9.8 || 3.5 || 1.3 || 0.8 || 0
|- class="sortbottom"
! colspan=3| Career
! 211
! 169
! 163
! 1747
! 1088
! 2835
! 885
! 233
! 218
! 0.8
! 0.8
! 8.3
! 5.2
! 13.4
! 4.2
! 1.1
! 1.0
! 33
|}

References

External links

1965 births
Living people
Melbourne Football Club players
Carlton Football Club players
Carlton Football Club Premiership players
East Fremantle Football Club players
East Fremantle Football Club coaches
Perth Football Club players
Western Australian State of Origin players
Western Australia cricketers
Cricketers from Western Australia
Australian cricketers
People educated at Wesley College, Perth
Australian rules footballers from Perth, Western Australia
One-time VFL/AFL Premiership players